The women's team sabre competition at the 2010 Asian Games in Guangzhou was held on 21 November at the Guangda Gymnasium.

Schedule
All times are China Standard Time (UTC+08:00)

Seeding
The teams were seeded taking into account the results achieved by competitors representing each team in the individual event.

Results

Final standing

References
Women's Team Sabre Results

External links
Official website 

Women sabre